James Elliott Alton Moniz (born 16 August 1972) is a Bermudian-born Danish cricketer.  Moniz is a right-handed batsman who bowls right-arm off break.

Moniz's father, Alton Moniz, played club cricket in Bermuda.  He is also related to Bermudian politician, Trevor Moniz, who is the deputy-leader of the United Bermuda Party.  Another relative includes the former Bermuda wicket-keeper Barry DeCouto, who played for Bermuda in the ICC Trophy.  He has lived in Denmark for several years, teaching at an elementary school.  In March 2012, Denmark took part in the World Twenty20 Qualifier in the United Arab Emirates, having qualified for the event by winning the European T20 Championship.  Moniz was selected in Denmark's fourteen man squad for the qualifier, making his Twenty20 debut against his native Bermuda at the Sharjah Cricket Association Stadium.  He made six further appearances during the competition, the last of which came against Oman, with him scoring a total of 84 runs in the tournament at an average of 14.00, with a high score of 47 not out, which came in a defeat against the Netherlands.

References

External links
James Moniz at ESPNcricinfo
James Moniz at CricketArchive

1972 births
Living people
Danish cricketers
Danish educators